Alluaudia procera, or Madagascar ocotillo, is a deciduous succulent plant species of the family Didiereaceae. It is endemic to south Madagascar.

Description
This plant is a spiny succulent shrub, with thick water-storing stems and leaves that are deciduous in the long dry season.  Although strikingly similar in appearance, it is not closely related to the ocotillo, Fouquieria splendens of the Sonoran Deserts in North America.

Young alluaudias form a tangle of stems that last for several years, after which a strong central stem develops.  The basal stems then die out, leaving a tree-like stem that branches higher up on the main trunk.

Like other members of family Didiereaceae, the leaves of Alluaudia, produced from brachyblasts similar to the areoles found in cacti, are small, appear single and are accompanied with conical spines. Its flowers are unisexual and radially symmetric.

Taxonomy
The Didiereaceae comprise 11 species divided into 4 genera, of which the largest is Alluaudia (six species). Alluaudia has been subdivided into the 2 sections Alluaudia and Androyella. In this way, Alluaudia procera has two sisters, Alluaudia ascendens and Alluaudia montagnacii.

Based on molecular phylogeny conducted Alluaudia, Alluaudiopsis, and Didierea from the family are all supported as monophyletic. Relationships within the genus Alluaudia are relevant to the evolution of polyploidy within the family.

Researchers haven't figured out where the family Didiereaceae originates. However, the nearest relative of the Didiereaceae, Calyptrotheca somalensis, is endemic to East Africa, from which the island of Madagascar separated 100 million years ago. Thus, the Didiereaceae may have originated from the dispersal to Madagascar of a Calyptrotheca-like East African ancestor.

References

Didiereaceae
Endemic flora of Madagascar
Near threatened plants
Plants described in 1903
Flora of the Madagascar spiny thickets